DnaNudge is a British company specializing in DNA testing. In late 2020, during the COVID-19 pandemic, it introduced COVID Nudge, a rapid RT-PCR test for COVID-19. The device uses a disposable sample capsule that is placed into a sample processor box, and gives results in 90 minutes. As of August 2020, the British government had ordered 5000 of the sample processor boxes.

Sir Richard Sykes joined its board in 2021.

Origins
The company was co-founded by Chris Toumazou.

See also
 Imperial College London, associated institution

References

External links
 

Health care companies of the United Kingdom